Paxton Schafer (born February 26, 1976) is a Canadian former professional ice hockey goaltender. Schafer was drafted 47th overall by the Boston Bruins in the 1995 NHL Entry Draft and played three games for them during the 1996–97 season. The rest of his career, which lasted from 1996 to 2003, was spent in various minor leagues. He later spent several years playing senior hockey, finally retiring in 2012.

Career statistics

Regular season and playoffs

Awards
 WHL East First All-Star Team – 1995

External links
 

1976 births
Living people
Baton Rouge Kingfish players
Boston Bruins draft picks
Boston Bruins players
Canadian ice hockey goaltenders
Charlotte Checkers (1993–2010) players
Cincinnati Mighty Ducks players
Flint Generals players
Greenville Grrrowl players
Ice hockey people from Alberta
Medicine Hat Tigers players
Missouri River Otters players
New Orleans Brass players
Pee Dee Pride players
Providence Bruins players
Quad City Mallards (UHL) players
Sportspeople from Medicine Hat